Brachycoryna melsheimeri is a species of leaf beetle in the family Chrysomelidae. It can be found in North America.

References

Further reading

 
 
 

Cassidinae
Articles created by Qbugbot
Beetles described in 1873